Manfred Magnus (born October 4, 1939 in Salzburg, Austria) is an Austrian former motorcycle racer. He was five times  the Austrian motorcycle Champion.

His life
Already as a young boy he took place at  soap  box  derby on the motorway at the Walserberg, near Salzburg towards the German border and on the hill of the pilgrimage  church Maria Plain. In the age of 15 he got his first own moped, a Puch. This Puch-Moped was the fastest one in Salzburg according  to  his  statement. Just one year older he got his  driver's  licence   and took place at the Sollböck-Bergwertungsfahrt in Lower Austria (1956) with KTM-Tarzan. He won a   gold  medal. But in 1957  he started the first time a real motorcycle race at the int. motorcycle and automobile ice-race on the lake Zell am See and got second in the 125-ccm- class Skijöring behind the Salzburgian Paul Schwarz and Lechner (all with KTM). It followed a third place at the airport-race in Knittelfeld, Styria in the 125-ccm-class and second place in the 175-ccm-class.

The year 1958 started with an ice-race in Thiersee, Tyrol, which he finished in the 125-ccm-class as second behind the Tyrolean Franz Albert; but already in the 175-ccm-race at the same day he beat Albert and crossed the finish line as first.

Due to his study in West Germany one saw Manfred Magnus first from 1961 on again as motorcycle racer. With his new acquired Paton 125 ccm he was the best Austrian racer in the Grand Prix of Austria in Salzburg on May 1. He finished this year with his first title being Austrian Motorcycle Champion in 125 ccm class. He repeated this title in 1963, 1964 and 1965 again, the last time he was Austrian Champion in 1970, but at that time in the 350-ccm-class.

Attempting to set new records, in 1963 he was successful on the motorway near Salzburg, at Grödig/Anif. He rode the flying kilometre on a works-Honda 250 ccm in 16,42 seconds, that means 219,245 km/h, a record for the classes 125 ccm, 250 ccm und 350 ccm, which is even today valid.

His results

References

 Motorradalbum, Helmut Krackowizer, 1990, VF Verlagsgesellschaft Wiesbaden, Seite 122 ff
 Motorradsport, Helmut Krackowizer, Peter Carrick, Verlag Welsermühl, 1979, Seite 263, 313 ff
 Der Rennberg - Die Rennen auf den Salzburger Gaisberg, Siegfried Strasser, Weishaupt Verlag, 2004, 
 Motorrad-, Literatur- und Bildarchiv Helmut Krackowizer
 Informations from Manfred Magnus (see also in Salzburg-Wiki)
 www.motorsportstatistik.com Manfred Magnus - seine Erfolge
 www.motorsportstatistik.com/Rennsportstatistik-international 
 Leistungsblatt für das Sportehrenzeichen Gold mit Brillanten des Salzburger Automobil-, Motorrad- und Touring-Club - fünf Seiten Liste der Erfolge, von Manfred Magnus (4. März 2009)
 www.motorrad-autogrammkarten.de/de/motorradrennsport-statistik
 Das Österreichische Motorrad, Motorradmagazin, Jahrgänge 1957, 1958, 1960

1939 births
Living people
Sportspeople from Salzburg
Austrian motorcycle racers